Goose Egg is an unincorporated community located in Natrona County, Wyoming, United States. It is 5,344 feet above sea level. It appears to have been named for a natural feature, namely, a nest of goose eggs laid by a Canada goose.

Goose Egg lies within Natrona County School District Number 1. It once had a post office, which has closed as of 2016. The United States Geological Survey had a water station at Coal Creek near Goose Egg, from the 1960s through the 1980s.

Goose Egg was the residence of songwriter Albert Norton, composer of Our boys are marching again, a patriotic ditty composed in 1943 during World War II.

References

Unincorporated communities in Natrona County, Wyoming
Unincorporated communities in Wyoming